Taquipirenda is a gas pipeline station in the Santa Cruz Department of Bolivia.

The facility is served by Taquipirenda Airport.

References 

Populated places in Santa Cruz Department (Bolivia)